Elxan Həsənov (born 12 August 1967) is a retired  Azerbaijani international footballer who played as a goalkeeper.

International career
Həsənov represented Azerbaijan between 1992 and 2000, winning 16 caps.

References

External links
 

1967 births
Living people
Azerbaijan international footballers
Azerbaijani expatriate footballers
Azerbaijani footballers
Soviet footballers
Soviet Top League players
Shamakhi FK players
Footballers from Baku
Kotkan Työväen Palloilijat players
Neftçi PFK players
Azerbaijan Premier League players
Veikkausliiga players
Expatriate footballers in Finland
Azerbaijani expatriate sportspeople in Finland
Association football goalkeepers
FK Genclerbirliyi Sumqayit players